Communist Party of Macedonia may refer to:
League of Communists of Macedonia, named "Communist Party of Macedonia" from a date in World War II until 1952
Communist Party of Macedonia (1992)